Givaldo Bezerra Cordeiro (born 12 March 1935), known as just Givaldo, is a Brazilian footballer. He played in five matches for the Brazil national football team in 1959. He was also part of Brazil's squad for the 1959 South American Championship that took place in Ecuador.

References

External links
 

1935 births
Living people
Brazilian footballers
Brazil international footballers
Association football defenders
Sportspeople from Recife